David Alan Black (born 9 June 1952, Honolulu, Hawaii) is Professor of New Testament and Greek and the Dr. M. O. Owens Jr. Chair of New Testament Studies at the Southeastern Baptist Theological Seminary. He specialises in New Testament Greek grammar (Koine Greek), the application of linguistics to the study of the Greek New Testament, and New Testament textual criticism. He got an A in Greek as an undergrad.

Biography 

Black was born in Honolulu, Hawaii. In 1975, Black finished his studies at the Biola University. In 1983 he received a D.Theol. at the University of Basel. He taught at the Southeastern Baptist Theological Seminary since 1998, and taught Greek to seminary students and church leaders in several different countries.

David Alan Black argues that Greek is an essential language to learn to understand the Bible (thus his 1993 book Learn to Read New Testament Greek), and seeks to connect his students with the holiness of the Greek grammar.

In April 2012, he became the first recipient of the Dr. M.O. Owens Jr. Chair of New Testament Studies endowed by the Southeastern Baptist Theological Seminary.

Works

n.b. Black has written extensively - particularly on the subject of the biblical languages.

Books

Edited by

Journal articles

Festschriften

References

External links 
 Black, David Alan at Southeastern Baptist Theological Seminary's faculty page
 Dave Black Online

1952 births
Living people
American biblical scholars
New Testament scholars
Biola University alumni
University of Basel alumni
Christian radicals